Denis Vladimirovich Peremenin (born 4 January 1976 in Chelyabinsk) is a former Russian football player.

He represented Turkmenistan at the 1998 Asian Games, acquiring Turkmenistani citizenship for the occasion.

Honours
Anzhi Makhachkala
Russian Cup finalist: 2000–01

References

1976 births
Sportspeople from Chelyabinsk
Living people
Russian footballers
Turkmenistan international footballers
FC Torpedo Miass players
FK Köpetdag Aşgabat players
Russian expatriate footballers
Expatriate footballers in Turkmenistan
FC Anzhi Makhachkala players
Russian Premier League players
FC Fakel Voronezh players
FC Dynamo Saint Petersburg players
FC Sodovik Sterlitamak players
FC Lada-Tolyatti players
Association football midfielders
Footballers at the 1998 Asian Games
Turkmenistan footballers
Asian Games competitors for Turkmenistan
FC Spartak Nizhny Novgorod players